Thomas Ingenlath is a German car designer and is currently CEO of Polestar and previously Senior Vice President Design at Volvo Cars.

Education and career
Ingenlath obtained an MA in Vehicle Design at the Royal College of Art in London following his degree at Fachhochschule für Gestaltung in Pforzheim, Germany.

He joined the Volkswagen Group and worked for Audi, chief exterior designer for Volkswagen and then in 2000 was appointed Chief Designer at Škoda. In 2006 he was promoted to Director of Design at the Volkswagen Design Center in Potsdam.

In 2012 he moved to Volvo and head of design and in 2017 became CEO of the Polestar subsidiary.

Notable designs
 Škoda Ahoj
 Škoda Superb
 Škoda Fabia
 Škoda Roomster
 Škoda Yeti
 Polestar 1
 Polestar 2

References

External links

German automobile designers
German chief executives
Living people
1964 births
Volkswagen Group people
Volvo Cars
Geely people
Volvo people